Poikilolaimus is a genus of nematodes belonging to the family Rhabditidae.

The species of this genus are found in Europe, America.

Species:

Poikilolaimus ernstmayri 
Poikilolaimus micoletzkyi
Poikilolaimus piniperdae 
Poikilolaimus regenfussi

References

Nematodes